Hossam Arafat is a Palestinian politician. As of 2014, he was a member of the Political Bureau of the Popular Front for the Liberation of Palestine - General Command (PFLP-GC) and the representative of PFLP-GC inside Palestine. He is based in the West Bank.

References

Palestinian politicians
Year of birth missing (living people)
Living people
People from Tulkarm Governorate
Birzeit University alumni
Damascus University alumni
Alumni of the University of Cambridge